PAR, the Personal Animation Recorder, is an analog video playback device for Amiga computers built by DPS (Digital Processing Systems, Canada) in 1993. It fits into an Amiga's Zorro II/III slot available in the Amiga 2000/3000/4000 models. It's capable of PAL or NTSC full-frame realtime or single-frame playback, using dedicated harddiscs connected to the board's IDE controller. Additional devices for the PAR include the DPS AD-3000 (PAL) video capture board, the DPS Personal TBC IV (NTSC) video capture and time-base-corrector board, and the Sunrize AD-516 audio recording and playback board.

References

Amiga